Piwniczna-Zdrój  (until 1999 Piwniczna, Pivnichna) is a town in Nowy Sącz County, Lesser Poland Voivodeship, Poland, near the border with Slovakia. Piwniczna-Zdrój is the name of both the town and its administrative district called a gmina in Polish, namely the Gmina Piwniczna-Zdrój.

Piwniczna-Zdrój is a popular tourist destination in Beskid Sądecki, part of the Western Carpathians mountain range of southern Poland featuring a protected area called the Poprad Landscape Park with its picturesque Poprad River Gorge.

Location
The total area of Piwniczna-Zdrój county is 3,830 ha (30.2% of which lies within the commune), while the rural area is 8,816 ha (69.8% of the commune). The municipal area consists of six villages: Młodów, Głębokie, Kokuszka, Łomnica-Zdrój, Wierchomla, and Zubrzyk.

In Poland, the word miasto is often used for both a town and a city. Miasto is a category applied on the basis of the administrative decision of the central government. The nearest English equivalent of Piwniczna-Zdrój would therefore be a town inside a county (gmina or powiat) that has a city charter. The equivalent title of County or Municipality however belongs to Nowy Sącz. The best matching organizational structure outside Poland would be a regional county municipality (RCM), which replaced established County designations in some countries and added layers of census divisions at its lower levels.

History
In the Middle Ages, the settlement of Piwniczna was located along a busy merchant trail, which joined Poland with Upper Hungary (now Slovakia). To protect the route and increase tax revenue, on July 1, 1348, in Kraków, King Kazimierz Wielki granted a privilege to a wealthy resident of Nowy Sacz, Hanko, upon which a brand new town was to be established in an oxbow of the Poprad river. The town was granted Magdeburg rights, and was named after its location, as the Poprad oxbow was called Piwniczna Szyja.

Piwniczna prospered in the period known as Polish Golden Age. Since ca. 1590 the town was governed by starostas from Nowy Sacz, but good times ended during catastrophic Swedish invasion of Poland (1655 - 1660), when Piwniczna was ransacked and burned. On April 7, 1769, during the Bar Confederation, a battle between rebels and Russian forces took place here. In 1770, Piwniczna was occupied by Austrians, and following the first partition of Poland (1772) Piwniczna became part of Austrian Galicia, in which it remained until 1918. In 1777, the population of Piwniczna was 1028.

For most of the 19th century, Piwniczna remained a small and poor town, with no industry. The situation began to change in the 1870s, when the rail line Tarnów - Stroze - Nowy Sacz - Leluchow was built. By 1880, the population of Piwniczna grew to almost 3,000, and since late 19th century, first tourists began to arrive here. Among them was the doctor Juliusz Korwin Gasiorowski from Lwow, who promoted local mineral waters.

In 1918 Piwniczna returned to Poland, and became part of Nowy Sacz County, Kraków Voivodeship. In the early 1930s, new baths were opened, and the town's importance as a spa grew. During World War II, the spa was used by the Wehrmacht soldiers. The town was seized by the Red Army in January 1945.

Population
The municipality of Piwniczna-Zdrój is currently characterized by a negative balance of migration (both permanent and temporary), with more inhabitants leaving than arriving. The City Council suggests that the rate of migration is larger than what the statistics indicate, because many people, especially those going abroad, do not officially declare their absence.

Two different government statistical reports have similar, but different numbers for 2009. This reflects the current reforms, as the information and data becomes more consistent, and centralized. The 2006–2007 data were less consistent, infrequent, and prone to clerical errors. Future data are hoped to be more accessible and streamlined as EU guidelines are followed more closely.

 For 2010, most accurate published statistical data for Gmina, Town, Rural is: 10,494, 5,805, 4,689 respectively.

General population changes
In terms of nationality, the population of Piwniczna Zdrój is nearly homogeneous. Some 99.93% of residents of the municipality determine their nationality as Polish, with only seven people declaring another nationality. It is not clear or stated from what age group these people are in, or where they are from.

Municipal Council of Piwniczna Zdroj is currently working under 2007–2013 Development Plan, where they have simply voiced and published recognition of the need and inability to meet or financially deal with any of major issues impeding on their future correction of problems, and growth stimulation. Some of the issues they point out to address, is the depletion and contamination natural resources, ranging from poor agricultural maintenance care affecting production and water quality, to items such as use of 80% household usage of low grade coal and coke for heating, to poor monitoring surface and ground water monitoring. The council did not address any pesticide production or use issues, though chemical production is one of Poland's GDP and the area suffers from depletion of natural resources. With the main focus concerning tourism which is primarily being sold and advertised as health and wellness, this is finally being acknowledged as being a topic of interest that should be for the community. Also the Municipal Council recognized that the tasks set in its recommended plans exceeds the capacity to finance it entirely from the community, and it becomes necessary to obtain financial assistance in the form of grants and concessional loans from the institutions which are involved in the financing of environmental projects, however no indication of what the community contributions or offers are.

Poland census data extracts for 2008 and 2010.

Economy
Unemployment rate for the whole municipality is 22.4% while in the district of Nowy Sącz it is 30.7%. The national average is about 20.6%. This data is stated by Council, which slightly differs from the Nowy Sącz District statement of the lower 18.7% unemployment rate in the public investment offers.

Primary business is tourism, followed by the mineral water and spa facilities. The number of registered business entities on record is 703, much higher than the county per capita average. The total of 491 registered companies are located in the city, and 212 in the rural areas. But very often as council states, they are sole proprietorships, not generating new jobs. Considering the recent History of Poland (1945–1989), its shortage economy, black market and the majority of the population supported Solidarity (Polish trade union), it is unclear how the community has recovered. The Solidarity organization still actively continues as a trade union, and the area is on a trade corridor with Slovakia.

The community finally made a statement: “Analyzing the municipal budget Piwniczna Zdroj in different years, it is noted declining revenues and income, which among other things affect changes made in the regulations on local taxes and fees. Paradoxically, the diminishing of local government own revenues may be deprived of the possibility of obtaining funds from the Structural Funds, in order to raise funds because the funds must have their own contribution, which in most cases is 50% of the entire project. Furthermore, the implementation of projects under the Structural Funds to implement their rule in the form of reimbursement of expenses incurred by the beneficiary eligible for the amount specified in the contract.”

Environmental concerns
Due to European Union agreements and treaties being signed, Environmental concerns and data are becoming part of the census data being collected and published. The European Union, as well as the rest of the world has investigative and corrective mechanisms in place, which trickle down to the micro level. The local council must address the issues that are raised in reports. According to the local documents, they are claiming lack of local resources and financing, and looking for external assistance. However, from the financial reports, they do not intend to raise or restructure local taxes, incur debt, or investigate and stem any black market or inaccurate financial reporting.

Notes and references

Cities and towns in Lesser Poland Voivodeship
Piwniczna Zdroj
Kraków Voivodeship (14th century – 1795)
Kingdom of Galicia and Lodomeria
Kraków Voivodeship (1919–1939)
Spa towns in Poland